Kabul airlift may refer to:

Kabul airlift of 1928–1929, during the Afghan Civil War
2021 Kabul airlift, during the Taliban offensive